United Nations Security Council resolution 1224, adopted unanimously on 28 January 1999, after reaffirming all previous resolutions on the question of the Western Sahara, the Council extended the mandate of the United Nations Mission for the Referendum in Western Sahara (MINURSO) until 11 February 1999.

The resolution requested the Secretary-General to keep the Council updated on developments, including the implementation of the Settlement Plan, the agreements reached between both the Government of Morocco and the Polisario Front and the viability of MINURSO's mandate.

See also
 Free Zone (region)
 History of Western Sahara
 List of United Nations Security Council Resolutions 1201 to 1300 (1998–2000)
 Sahrawi Arab Democratic Republic
 Wall (Western Sahara)

References

External links
 
Text of the Resolution at undocs.org

 1224
1999 in Morocco
 1224
 1224
January 1999 events
1999 in Western Sahara